The VideoNow  is a portable video player produced by Hasbro and released by their subsidiary Tiger Electronics in 2003. The systems use discs called PVDs (which stands for Personal Video Disc), which can store about 30 minutes (half an hour) of video, the length of an average TV show with commercials (a typical TV episode is about 20–23 minutes without them), so each PVD contains only one episode, with trailers at the end to use the leftover time on most PVDs, including Nickelodeon PVDs. Video data is stored on the left audio channel with audio on the right channel, thus making it impossible to achieve stereo sound on the system, which only plays in black and white. The video plays at 15fps. Most of the shows were from Nickelodeon, such as SpongeBob SquarePants and The Fairly OddParents, and later they released shows from Cartoon Network, such as Ed, Edd n Eddy and Dexter's Laboratory, Disney only mostly released episodes of America’s Funniest Home Videos and one Hannah Montana music video. A small amount of movies were also released on the system, but due to the limited space on a PVD, said movies would have to be released on at least three discs, depending on the length of said film. 
 
Hasbro also produced editing software for creating custom VideoNow Color PVDs called the VideoNow Media Wizard in 2005, which came with blank PVD media.
A number of unofficial solutions are available for creating the oddly-formatted VideoNow files, including a plug-in for the popular video processing program Virtual Dub. The files can then be burned to a CD-R using standard CD burning software, and the disc cut down to the required size.

As the VideoNow Color does not accept standard 8 cm mini-CDs, some creative users have resorted to cutting down standard 12 cm CD-R discs, though not without problems. Hasbro made recordable PVDs available without the Media Wizard from their online store.
However, at least one video has been posted on YouTube showing how VideoNow Color players can be easily modified to accept standard-sized CDs with a bit of cutting and gluing. Full-sized CDs can hold roughly 42 minutes of total video, and play with no difference in the modified player.

Because VideoNow uses video discs and has very little skip protection, it is more prone to skipping if the VideoNow is touched, bumped, or shaken while playing a PVD. It was discontinued in 2010.

Models

Standard Models
 VideoNow - The first model, released in 2003. Its screen has a resolution of 80×80, is black and white, and isn't backlit.  Instead, users would need to buy an official light accessory to use the device in the dark. PVDs made for this model are also much smaller than those made for later models. It uses  discs. 

 VideoNow Color - The second model, Released in 2004. Its most notable improvement over the original model is the screen, which along with the ability to display in full color, now has a resolution of 240×160 and a backlight. Another improvement is the ability to fast forward and rewind the video, while the first model only allowed for going between chapters. It is also backwards compatible with the original model's PVDs, though the image is cropped due to differing resolutions. It uses  discs.
 VideoNow Jr. - The third model, released by subsidiary Playskool in 2004. It is a variation of the VideoNow Color designed for preschoolers, with a more childish design, rubberized corners, bigger buttons for ease of use, and two eject hatches which have to be pulled at the same time to minimize the risk of opening the disc tray by accident. The PVDs for this system are also heavily flexible in order to prevent them from breaking when bent. Despite this, they can be played in a VideoNow Color and vice versa.
 VideoNow XP - The fourth model, released in 2005. It uses a clamshell design, has a larger screen than the VideoNow Color, and was designed with functionality for FMV games. Standard PVDs released during the XP's lifespan would also feature a simple trivia game with questions about the episode included, which could only be played on the XP. If a PVD game is put into a VideoNow Color or Jr, the footage will play in the order it is stored on the disc.
 VideoNow Color FX - The fifth and final model, released in 2006. It is effectively a rerelease of the VideoNow Color that uses translucent plastic.

Special editions 
 Kool-Aid Red VideoNow (only available through Kool-Aid Kool Points)
 SpongeBob Exclusive Edition Video Now Color (For the release of The SpongeBob SquarePants Movie)

Accessories
 VideoNow Light was a light accessory made for the original VideoNow, as it didn't have a backlight or its own. It requires a separate AA battery.
 A carrying case was made to store VideoNow and 5 PVDs in. There are 4 types, one each model.
 VideoNow-branded headphones were available with a standard 3.5 mm audio jack.
 VideoNow Media Wizard included basic editing software used to make custom PVDs to play on a Color/fx, XP, and Jr.
 VCamNow was a VideoNow-branded camcorder that came with a copy of the Media Wizard.

Shows included on VideoNow XP
4Kids Entertainment Mix (Sonic X / Kirby: Right Back at Ya! / The Cramp Twins / Teenage Mutant Ninja Turtles)
All Grown Up (Truth or Consequences)
America's Funniest Home Videos (Crazy Cats)
Ben 10 (Tourist Trap)
Camp Lazlo (No Beads, No Business / Miss Fru Fru)
Cartoon Network Mix Volume 1 (Ed, Edd n Eddy / Johnny Bravo / Codename: Kids Next Door)
Cartoon Network Mix Volume 2 (Dexter's Laboratory / The Powerpuff Girls / Codename: Kids Next Door)
Cartoon Network Mix Volume 3 (Hi Hi Puffy AmiYumi / Camp Lazlo / My Gym Partner's a Monkey)
Cheer! Show Your Spirit
Codename: Kids Next Door (Operation: ROBBERS / Operation: UTOPIA)
Danny Phantom (Parental Bonding)
Drake and Josh (Dune Buggy)
E! Hollywood Yearbook: Class of 2005
Ed, Edd n Eddy (Will Work for Ed / Ed, Ed, and Away)
Emma Roberts: Behind the Scenes with Emma Roberts
Fear Factor (Halloween Episode)
Foster's Home for Imaginary Friends
Hi Hi Puffy AmiYumi (Ski Sick / Claw and Order / Janice Jealous)
Hilary Duff: On the Road with Hilary Duff
Jamie Lynn Spears: A Weekend with Jamie Lynn Spears
Jesse McCartney: Backstage with Jesse McCartney'''Kirby: Right Back at Ya! (Kirby's Egg-Cellent Adventure)Mr. Bean: The Animated Series (UK and Germany only)My Gym Partner's a Monkey (It's the Scary Old Custodian, Adam Lyon / My Science Project)My Life as a Teenage Robot (Return of the Raggedy Android / The Boy Who Cried Robot)Ned's Declassified School Survival Guide (Teachers / Detention)Nick Mix (starting with volume 16)Nick Mix Volume 7 (My Life as a Teenage Robot / Jimmy Neutron: Boy Genius / The Fairly Oddparents)Nick Mix Volume 8 (The Amanda Show / Romeo! / The Brothers Garcia)Nick Mix Volume 9 (Romeo! / Ned's Declassified School Survival Guide / The Brothers Garcia)Nick Mix Volume 10 (Danny Phantom / Rocket Power / Jimmy Neutron: Boy Genius)Nick Mix Volume 11 (Unfabulous / The Amanda Show / The Brothers Garcia)Nick Mix Volume 12 (My Life as a Teenage Robot / Rugrats / The Fairly Oddparents)Nick Mix Volume 13 (Chalkzone / Jimmy Neutron: Boy Genius / The Fairly Oddparents)Nick Mix Volume 14 (SpongeBob SquarePants / Chalkzone / Rocker Power)Nick Mix Volume 15 (Drake and Josh / Unfabulous / Taina)Nick Mix Volume 16 (CatDog / SpongeBob SquarePants / Rocket Power)The Powerpuff GirlsRomeo! (Write Me a Hit)Scooby-Doo, Where Are You! (The Rage Backstage)SpongeBob SquarePants (Jellyfishing / Plankton)Superstars of the NBATeenage Mutant Ninja Turtles (Bishop's Gambit)The Adventures of Jimmy Neutron: Boy Genius (When Pants Attack)The Amanda ShowThe Fairly Oddparents (Scary Oddparents)The Story of Star WarsUnfabulous (The Rep)What’s New Scooby-DooWinx Club (Miss Magix)Yu-Gi-Oh! (The ESP Duelist, Parts 1 and 2)Zoey 101'' (New Roomies)

See also
 VCamNow
 ChatNow
 TVNow
 Hasbro
 Tiger Electronics
 Game Boy Advance Video
 Juice Box

References

External links
 VideoThen, a freeware tool to create black and white discs
 PVDTools, an open source set of tools to read black and white disc rips
 videonow_dec.c, another open source tool for reading black and white disc rips
 Source for Media Wizard blank PVDs, Hasbro FAX-in order form for blank Media Wizard PVD's
 VideoHelp.com forum discussion of VDN video conversion tools, including VideoNowDude's Virtual Dub plugin.
 VideoNow XP - Put a World of Entertainment in the Palm of Your Hand Checklist of VideoNow XP titles to collect.

Compact disc

2000s toys
Electronic toys
Consumer electronics
.
Rotating disc computer storage media
Audiovisual introductions in 2003
Video
Video storage